The 1956–57 DFB-Pokal was the 14th season of the annual German football cup competition. It began on 4 August 1957 and ended on 29 December 1957. 4 teams competed in the tournament of two rounds. In the final Bayern Munich defeated Fortuna Düsseldorf 1–0, thereby winning their first title.

Matches

Qualification round

Semi-finals

Final

References

External links
 Official site of the DFB 
 Kicker.de 
 1957 results at worldfootball.net
 1957 results at Fussballdaten.de 

1956-57
1956–57 in German football cups